Vittorio "Victor" Ottoboni (April 5, 1934 – October 15, 2014) was a U.S. soccer goalkeeper who earned one cap with the U.S. national team in an 8-1 loss to England on May 28, 1959.   He played his club soccer with the San Francisco Vikings.

References

United States men's international soccer players
Association football goalkeepers
1934 births
2014 deaths
American soccer players